Zadobje is a dispersed settlement in the hills southeast of Gorenja Vas in the Municipality of Gorenja Vas–Poljane in the Upper Carniola region of Slovenia.

References

External links

Zadobje on Geopedia

Populated places in the Municipality of Gorenja vas-Poljane